Brian Hennessy (born 29 August 1969) is an Irish retired hurler who played as a right corner-back for the Offaly senior team.

Born in Birr, County Offaly, Hennessy first played competitive hurling in his youth. He first came to prominence on the inter-county scene when he first linked up with the Offaly minor team, before later joining the under-21 side. He made his senior debut during the 1990-91 National League and immediately became a regular member of the team. During his career he won one National Hurling League medal on the field of play.

At club level Hennessy is a one-time All-Ireland medallist with Birr. In addition to this he also won four Leinster medals and five championship medals.

His retirement came following the conclusion of the 1995 championship.

Honours

Team

Birr
All-Ireland Senior Club Hurling Championship (2): 1995, 1998 (sub)
Leinster Senior Club Hurling Championship (4): 1991, 1994, 1997, 1999
Offaly Senior Club Hurling Championship (5): 1991, 1994, 1997, 1999, 2000

Offaly
All-Ireland Senior Hurling Championship (1): 1994
Leinster Senior Hurling Championship (2): 1994, 1995
National Hurling League (1): 1990-91
Leinster Under-21 Hurling Championship (1): 1989
All-Ireland Minor Hurling Championship (1): 1987
Leinster Minor Hurling Championship (1): 1987

References

1969 births
Living people
Birr hurlers
Offaly inter-county hurlers